The International Journal of Modern Physics is a series of Physics journals published by World Scientific.

International Journal of Modern Physics A 

The International Journal of Modern Physics A was established in 1986, and covers specifically particles and fields, gravitation, cosmology, and nuclear physics.

The journal is abstracted and indexed in:

International Journal of Modern Physics B 

The International Journal of Modern Physics B was established in 1987. It covers specifically developments in condensed matter, statistical and applied physics, and high Tc superconductivity.

The journal is abstracted and indexed in:

International Journal of Modern Physics C 

The International Journal of Modern Physics C was established in 1990. It covers specifically computational physics, physical computation and related subjects, with topics such as astrophysics, computational biophysics, materials science, and statistical physics.

The journal is abstracted and indexed in:

International Journal of Modern Physics D 

The International Journal of Modern Physics D was established in 1992. It covers specifically gravitation, astrophysics and cosmology, with topics such as general relativity, quantum gravity, cosmic particles and radiation.

The journal is abstracted and indexed in:

International Journal of Modern Physics E 

The International Journal of Modern Physics E was established in 1992. It covers specifically topics on experimental, theoretical and computational nuclear science, and its applications and interface with astrophysics and particle physics.

The journal is abstracted and indexed in:
 Current Contents/Physical, Chemical & Earth Sciences
 Astrophysics Data System (ADS) Abstract Service
 Inspec

International Journal of Modern Physics: Conference Series

References

World Scientific academic journals
Physics journals
English-language journals